Rissom Gebre Meskei (born 19 September 1941) is a former Ethiopian cyclist. He competed in the individual road race and team time trial events at the 1972 Summer Olympics.

References

External links
 

1941 births
Living people
Ethiopian male cyclists
Olympic cyclists of Ethiopia
Cyclists at the 1972 Summer Olympics
Place of birth missing (living people)
20th-century Ethiopian people